Mihir Goswami is an Indian politician from the state of West Bengal. He was a member of the West Bengal Legislative Assembly from 1996–2001 and 2016–2021, from the Cooch Behar Dakshin constituency. He was the chairman of NBSTC (North Bengal State Transport Corporation). He was a member of Trinamool Congress party until 2020, when he joined the Bharatiya Janata Party. He currently represents the Natabari.

Political career  
He was District Youth Congress President in undivided Congress (When Mamata Banerjee State Youth Congress President). He won the Cooch Behar Uttar (Vidhan Sabha constituency) seat in 1996 as an Indian National Congress candidate. Later, he joined the All India Trinamool Congress in 1998. Later, he won the same seat again in the 2016 (Cooch Behar Dakshin) West Bengal Legislative Assembly election. 

He resigned from the TMC and joined the Bharatiya Janata Party on 27 November 2020, having resigned his offices on 31 October. He was elected from the  Natabari (Vidhan Sabha constituency) constituency in the 2021 West Bengal Legislative Assembly election as a BJP candidate.

References

External links 
 West Bengal Legislative Assembly
 

West Bengal MLAs 1996–2001
West Bengal MLAs 2016–2021
Living people
Trinamool Congress politicians from West Bengal
1954 births
Bharatiya Janata Party politicians from West Bengal
West Bengal MLAs 2021–2026
Deputy opposition leaders
People from Cooch Behar district